The following is a list of Ottawa Rough Riders all-time records and statistics over their existence from 1876 to 1996.

Games played 

Most Games Played
201 – Moe Racine (1958–74)
186 – Gerry Organ (1971–77, 79–83)
169 – Bob Simpson (1950–62)
167 – Ron Stewart (1958–70)
166 – Russ Jackson (1958–69)

Most Seasons Played
22 – Eddie Emerson (1912–15, 19–35, 37)
17 – Moe Racine (1958–74)
14 – Joe Tubman (1913–15, 19–29)
13 – Charlie Connell (1920–32)
13 – Bob Simpson (1950–62)
13 – Ron Stewart (1958–70)

Scoring 

Most points – Career
1462 – Gerry Organ (1971–77, 79–83)
841 – Dean Dorsey (1984–87, 89–90)
772 – Terry Baker (1990–95)
402 – Ron Stewart (1958–70)
392 – Moe Racine (1958–74)

Most Points – Season
202 – Terry Baker – 1991
184 – Terry Baker – 1992
178 – Terry Baker – 1994
176 – Dean Dorsey – 1990
148 – Dean Dorsey – 1989

Most Points – Game
24 – Dave Thelen – versus Toronto Argonauts, September 16, 1959
24 – Ron Stewart – at Montreal Alouettes, October 10, 1960
24 – Art Green – versus Hamilton Tiger-Cats, September 7, 1975
24 – Dean Dorsey – versus Saskatchewan Roughriders, September 24, 1989

Most Touchdowns – Career
70 – Bob Simpson (1950–62)
67 – Ron Stewart (1958–70)
59 – Tony Gabriel (1975–81)
55 – Russ Jackson (1958–69)
54 – Whit Tucker (1962–70)

Most Touchdowns – Season
18 – Alvin Walker – 1982
16 – Ron Stewart – 1960
15 – Art Green – 1976
14 – Vic Washington – 1969
14 – Art Green – 1975
14 – Tony Gabriel – 1976

Most Touchdowns – Game
4 – Ken Charlton – versus Hamilton Tigers, November 9, 1946
4 – Dave Thelen – versus Toronto Argonauts, September 16, 1959
4 – Ron Stewart – at Montreal Alouettes, October 10, 1960
4 – Art Green – versus Hamilton Tiger-Cats, September 7, 1975

Most Receiving Touchdowns – Career
65 – Bob Simpson (1950–62)
61 – Tony Gabriel (1975–81)
54 – Whit Tucker (1962–70)
34 – Stephen Jones (1990–94)
33 – Hugh Oldham (1970–74)

Most Receiving Touchdowns – Season
14 – Tony Gabriel – 1976
13 – Whit Tucker – 1968
13 – Hugh Oldham – 1970
12 – David Williams – 1990 
11 – Tony Gabriel – 1978
11 – Stephen Jones – 1990 
11 – Jock Climie – 1993 

Most Receiving Touchdowns – Game
3 – Many

Most Rushing Touchdowns – Career
54 – Russ Jackson (1958–69)
43 – Ron Stewart (1958–70)
39 – Dave Thelen (1958–64)
32 – Art Green (1973–76, 78) 
24 – Alvin Walker (1982–84) 

Most Rushing Touchdowns – Season
15 – Ron Stewart – 1960
13 – Art Green – 1976
13 – Alvin Walker – 1982
11 – Art Green – 1975
10 – Alvin Walker – 1983 
10 – Reggie Barnes – 1991

Passing 

Most Passing Yards – Career
24,593 – Russ Jackson (1958–69)
11,251 – Damon Allen (1989–91)
10,937 – J. C. Watts (1981–86)
10,288 – Tom Burgess (1986, 1992–93)
9663 – Tom Clements (1975–78)

Most Passing Yards – Season
5063 – Tom Burgess – 1993
4275 – Damon Allen – 1991
4173 – Danny Barrett – 1994
4026 – Tom Burgess – 1992
3977 – David Archer – 1996

Most Passing Yards – Game
471 – Chris Isaac – versus Montreal Concordes, July 29, 1982
467 – David Archer – versus BC Lions, July 12, 1996
448 – Sammy Garza – versus Birmingham Barracudas, September 1, 1995

Most Pass Completions – Career
1,356 – Russ Jackson (1958–69)
767 – Damon Allen (1989–91)
743 – J. C. Watts (1981–86)
700 – Tom Burgess (1986, 1992–93)
677 – Tom Clements (1975–78)

Most Pass Completions – Season
329 – Tom Burgess – 1993
299 – Danny Barrett – 1994
294 – David Archer – 1996
282 – Damon Allen – 1991
276 – Tom Burgess – 1992

Most Pass Completions – Game
30 – Tom Burgess – versus Hamilton Tiger-Cats, July 16, 1993
30 – David Archer – versus Hamilton Tiger-Cats, July 28, 1996

Most Passing Touchdowns – Career
185 – Russ Jackson (1958–69)
75 – Damon Allen (1989–91)
66 – Tom Clements (1975–78)
64 – Tom Burgess (1986, 1992–93)
56 – Condredge Holloway (1975–80)

Most Passing Touchdowns – Season
34 – Damon Allen – 1990
33 – Russ Jackson – 1969
30 – Tom Burgess – 1993
29 – Tom Burgess – 1992
25 – Russ Jackson – 1967
25 – Russ Jackson – 1968

Most Passing Touchdowns – Game
5 – Chris Isaac – versus Montreal Concordes, July 29, 1982
5 – Damon Allen – versus Edmonton Eskimos, July 26, 1990
5 – Tom Burgess – versus Toronto Argonauts, July 9, 1992

Rushing 

Most Rushing Yards – Career
6,917 – Dave Thelen (1958–64)
5,689 – Ron Stewart (1958–70)
5,045 – Russ Jackson (1958–69)
4,001 – Reggie Barnes (1990–93, 96)
3,586 – Art Green (1973–76, 78)

Most Rushing Yards – Season (all 1000 yard rushers included)
1486 – Reggie Barnes – 1991
1431 – Alvin Walker – 1983
1407 – Dave Thelen – 1960
1339 – Dave Thelen – 1959
1260 – Reggie Barnes – 1990
1257 – Art Green – 1976
1188 – Art Green – 1975
1141 – Alvin Walker – 1982
1075 – Orville Lee – 1988
1074 – Richard Crump – 1980
1036 – Damon Allen – 1991
1032 – Dave Thelen – 1961
1020 – Ron Stewart – 1960
1016 – Richard Holmes – 1977*

NOTE - In 1977 Richard Holmes played with Toronto and rushed for 151 years with that team.

Most Rushing Yards – Game
287 – Ron Stewart – at Montreal Alouettes, October 10, 1960
213 – Tim McCray – versus Edmonton Eskimos, September 21, 1984
209 – Dave Thelen – versus Toronto Argonauts, September 14, 1960
203 – Alvin Walker – versus Calgary Stampeders, October 23, 1982 

Most Rushing Attempts – Career
1,211 – Dave Thelen (1958–64)
983 – Ron Stewart (1958–70)
777 – Reggie Barnes (1990–93, 96)
745 – Art Green (1973–76, 78)
726 – Russ Jackson (1958–69)

Most Rushing Attempts – Season
291 – Reggie Barnes – 1991
258 – Art Green – 1975
245 – Dave Thelen – 1960
238 – Alvin Walker – 1983
234 – Art Green – 1976

Most Rushing Attempts – Game
33 – Dave Thelen – versus Toronto Argonauts, September 14, 1960
30 – Tim McCray – versus Edmonton Eskimos, September 21, 1984
27 – Alvin Walker – versus Calgary Stampeders, October 23, 1982 

Longest Rush
87 – Bo Scott – at Montreal Alouettes, August 26, 1965
85 – Vic Washington – versus BC Lions, August 13, 1969
81 – Tim McCray – versus Edmonton Eskimos, September 21, 1984

Receiving 

Most Receiving Yards – Career
7,484 – Tony Gabriel (1975–81)
6,092 – Whit Tucker (1962–70)
6,034 – Bob Simpson (1950–62)
5,108 – Stephen Jones (1990–94)
3,807 – Gerald Alphin (1987–89)

Most Receiving Yards – Season
1471 – Gerald Alphin – 1989
1402 – Margene Adkins – 1969
1400 – Stephen Jones – 1992
1362 – Tony Gabriel – 1977
1320 – Tony Gabriel – 1976

Most Receiving Yards – Game
258 – Bob Simpson – versus Toronto Argonauts, September 29, 1956
254 – Stephen Jones – versus Toronto Argonauts, July 9, 1992
231 – Margene Adkins – versus Toronto Argonauts, October 15, 1969

Most Receptions – Career
444 – Tony Gabriel (1975–81)
278 – Stephen Jones (1990–94)
274 – Bob Simpson (1950–62)
272 – Whit Tucker (1962–70)
202 – Jock Climie (1991–94)

Most Receptions – Season
94 – Marc Lewis – 1987
79 – Joe Rogers – 1996
75 – Stephen Jones – 1992
74 – Stephen Jones – 1993
73 – Tony Gabriel – 1981

Most Receptions – Game
13 – Marc Barousse – at Hamilton Tiger-Cats, July 3, 1986
11 – Tony Gabriel – versus Montreal Alouettes, August 16, 1976
11 – Robert Gordon – at BC Lions, November 2, 1996

Interceptions 

Most Interceptions – Career
46 – Joe Poirier (1959–70)
37 – Al Marcelin (1970–75)
32 – Jerry Campbell (1968–75)
31 – Rod Woodward (1971–76)

Most Interceptions – Season
11 – Less Browne – 1992
10 – Don Sutherin – 1969
10 – Mike Nelms – 1979
10 – Troy Wilson – 1988
9 – Al Marcelin – 1970

Most Interceptions – Game
4 – Chris Sigler – versus Montreal Alouettes, June 27, 1986

Most Interception Return Yards – Career
658 – Joe Poirier (1959–70)
543 – Rod Woodward (1971–76)

Most Interception Return Yards – Season
259 – Less Browne – 1992
236 – Barry Ardern – 1969

Most Interception Return Yards – Game
172 – Barry Ardern – at Hamilton Tiger-Cats, November 1, 1969

Tackles (since 1987, Def and ST Tackles since 1991) 
Most Total Tackles – Season
127 – Bruce Holmes – 1990

Most Defensive Tackles – Season
83 – Remi Trudel – 1995
76 – Brett Young – 1995
68 – Brian Bonner – 1991
68 – DeWayne Knight – 1996
64 – Scott Flagel – 1991

Most Defensive Tackles – Game
14 – Bruce Holmes – at Edmonton Eskimos, October 15, 1989

Most Special Team Tackles – Career
42 – Dean Noel (1993–94)
38 – Joe Sardo (1992–94)
36 – Sean Foudy (1989–92)
35 – Mike Graybill (1993–94)

Most Special Team Tackles – Season
30 – Dean Noel – 1994
27 – Daniel Hunter – 1991
26 – Gord Weber – 1992
24 – Ron Goetz – 1993
24 – Stefen Reid – 1995

Quarterback sacks (since 1981) 

Most Sacks – Career
71 – Greg Marshall (1981–87)
57 – Loyd Lewis (1985–91, 95–96)
41 – Gregg Stumon (1990–93)
39 – Angelo Snipes (1991–93)
22 – Gary Dulin (1982–84)

Most Sacks – Season
20 – Angelo Snipes – 1992
16.5 – Greg Marshall – 1984
15.5 – Greg Marshall – 1983
15 – Loyd Lewis – 1986
14 – Angelo Snipes – 1993

Most Sacks – Game
???

References 
Total football stats Ottawa Rough Riders
Ottawa Rough Riders Records
CFL Record Book 2009
CFL website

Ottawa Rough Riders
Canadian Football League records and statistics
Ontario sport-related lists
Redblacks